Lü Zhengcao (4 January 1904 – 13 October 2009) was a Chinese military officer. He was one of the original Shang Jiang of the People's Liberation Army.

Lü was born in Haicheng, in the province of Liaoning. He joined the Chinese Communist Party in 1937. He fought in China's war against Japan 1937–1945 as well as the civil war against the Kuomintang 1945–1949.

Before he joined the Communists, Lü worked as an assistant to the Kuomintang general, Zhang Xueliang. It was in this role that he was a witness to the Xi'an Incident, whereby Zhang and his fellow general, Yang Hucheng, forced the then-Chinese leader, Chiang Kai-shek to suspend the civil war with the Communists in 1936 in order and join forces against the Japanese.

Lü resigned from the Kuomintang in 1937 and joined the Communist Party. He then commanded a military force that fought the Japanese army in northern China.

Following the Communist victory of 1949, Lü served as a senior military leader of the PRC. He was appointed as a Shang Jiang (general) in 1955 following the re-establishment of rank.

In 1985, to support the return of the critically endangered Père David's deer to China, Lü Zhengcao helped found and chair the China Milu Foundation, now known as the China Biodiversity Conservation and Green Development Foundation.

On 13 October 2009, Lü died in Beijing at the age of 105 by Western age reckoning, or at the age of 106 by the traditional age system. At the time of his death, he was the last survivor of the original generals of the People's Liberation Army.

References

External links
Last of New China's first generals passes away - Obituary from Xinhua
 Lu Zhengcao - Daily Telegraph obituary

1904 births
2009 deaths
People's Liberation Army generals from Liaoning
Chinese centenarians
Men centenarians
People from Haicheng, Liaoning
Chinese Communist Party politicians from Liaoning
People's Republic of China politicians from Liaoning
Alternate members of the 7th Central Committee of the Chinese Communist Party
Vice Chairpersons of the National Committee of the Chinese People's Political Consultative Conference
Politicians from Anshan
Burials at Babaoshan Revolutionary Cemetery
Chinese people in rail transport